Victoria Peak is a mountain located in the Sutton Range of the Vancouver Island Ranges.  At 2163 m, it is the third highest peak on Vancouver Island.  The mountain is located on the White River valley and has mountains of comparable elevation nearby.  It is accessible as a day trip by logging road and is visible from Campbell River and the Discovery Islands.

See also
 Monarchy in British Columbia
 Mountain peaks of Canada
 List of Ultras of North America

References

Sources

External links
 "Victoria Peak, British Columbia" on Peakbagger

Two-thousanders of British Columbia
Vancouver Island Ranges
Rupert Land District